Tephrochlamys rufiventris  is a species of fly in the family Heleomyzidae. It is found in the  Palearctic .

References

External links
Images representing Tephrochlamys rufiventris at BOLD

Heleomyzidae
Insects described in 1830
Diptera of Europe